Route 202, also known as Long Harbour Road, is a  east–west highway along the Avalon Peninsula on the island of Newfoundland. It connects the communities of Long Harbour-Mount Arlington Heights and Long Harbour Station with Chapel Arm and the Trans-Canada Highway.

Route description

Route 202 begins in Long Harbour-Mount Arlington Heights at the intersection between Main Road and the gravel access road for the Long Harbour Nickel Processing Plant. It heads northeast through rural areas to have an intersection with Route 101 (Long Harbour Access Road) before leaving town and passing through rural wooded areas for the next several kilometres, where the highway passes through Long Harbour Station. Route 202 passes through more wooded areas before entering the Chapel Arm town limits and coming to an end at an interchange with Route 1 (Trans-Canada Highway, exit 27), with the road continuing northeast as Route 201 (Osprey Trail) into downtown.

Major intersections

References

202